Deep Creek Valley is a  long valley located in southwest Tooele County at the Utah-Nevada border; the extreme south of the valley is in northwest Juab County. The valley parallels the west flank of the Deep Creek Range, both north-trending. In the north-northeast, its outlet widens into the southwest of the Great Salt Lake Desert region.

The mountain range turns southwest and west in the south, and encloses the higher altitude terrain of the valley; here, the Goshute Indian Reservation lies in the mountains and the Deep Creek Valley's south; the community of Goshute is adjacent the valley; the reservation also extends westward into Nevada, into the east of the Antelope Valley.

Description
Deep Creek Valley follows the drainage of the north-flowing Deep Creek. In the valley's southern half, from Ibapah, UT on Deep Creek, at the northwest of the Deep Creek Range, and south, (East Deep Creek), to Goshute in the mountains, nine canyons and washes feed the Deep Creek system from the Deep Creek Range. Hills west, about 7-9 mi of drainage, from Antelope Valley's east perimeter, washes flow east or northeast.

The Deep Creek Valley is narrow, only about 4 mi, but follows circuitous routes around small hills, as well as Gold Hill northeast, and the Ferber Hills, northwest on the Nevada-Utah border. On Deep Creek, at the south of these two hill regions, and with the northwest convergence of the Deep Creek Range, is White Sage Flat. Washes and creeks converge here at the Flat, but Deep Creek continues on north-flowing.

The center of the valley is between White Sage Flat, and Ibapah,  to the south.

See also

 List of valleys of Utah

References

External links

 White Sage Flat, hometownlocator, coordinates(Map close-up of Deep Creek, west of Gold Hill Pass, Gold Hill, Utah)

Great Salt Lake Desert
Landforms of Tooele County, Utah
Landforms of Juab County, Utah
Valleys of Utah